Sainte-Geneviève-des-Bois is the name of two communes in France:

 Sainte-Geneviève-des-Bois, Essonne
Sainte-Geneviève-des-Bois Cemetery, often referred to as "Sainte-Geneviève-des-Bois"
 Sainte-Geneviève-des-Bois, Loiret